The 2011 Aspria Tennis Cup Trofeo City Life was a professional tennis tournament played on outdoor red clay courts. It was the sixth edition of the tournament and was part of the 2011 ATP Challenger Tour. It took place in Milan, Italy between 11 and 19 June 2011.

Singles main draw entrants

Seeds

 Rankings are as of June 6, 2011.

Other entrants
The following players received wildcards into the singles main draw:
  Thomas Muster
  Stefano Travaglia
  Matteo Trevisan
  Matteo Volante

The following players received entry from the qualifying draw:
  Andrea Arnaboldi
  Benjamin Balleret
  Antonio Comporto
  James McGee

Champions

Singles

 Albert Ramos def.  Evgeny Korolev, 6–4, 3–0, ret.

Doubles

 Adrián Menéndez /  Simone Vagnozzi def.  Andrea Arnaboldi /  Leonardo Tavares, 0–6, 6–3, [10–5]

References

Official website
ITF search
Entry list

Aspria Tennis Cup Trofeo City Life
Aspria Tennis Cup
Clay court tennis tournaments